The Sri Lankan cricket team toured South Africa from 25 October 2002 to 18 March 2003.

The Test series was won by South Africa, 2-0. South Africa won both the Tests played at Johannesburg and Centurion. Jacques Kallis was awarded the man of the series for having scored 165 runs at an average of 55.00 and bagging 10 wickets at an average of 18.50.

Test Series

1st Test

2nd Test

One Day Internationals (ODIs)

1st ODI

2nd ODI

3rd ODI

4th ODI

5th ODI

References

2002 in South African cricket
2002–03 South African cricket season
2003 in South African cricket
2002-03
International cricket competitions in 2002–03
2002 in Sri Lankan cricket
2003 in Sri Lankan cricket